Criollísima is a 33-RPM LP album by Venezuelan composer/arranger/conductor Aldemaro Romero, released in 1957, under contract with RCA Victor and distributed by Grabadora Venezolana de Discos.

Track listing

Miscellanea
The woman at the cover of the album is the Venezuelan Miss World 1955, Susana Duijm.
The album was recorded on November 1956 at the Mexican RCA Victor studios.
The production and distribution was in charged of the company Grabadora Venezolana de Discos.

1957 albums
Aldemaro Romero albums
RCA Records albums
Albums produced by Aldemaro Romero